Anatoly Dneprov may refer to:

 Anatoly Dneprov (writer) (1919–1975), Soviet Ukrainian author
 Anatoly Dneprov (singer) (1947–2008), Soviet singer